Arthur Johns (October 30, 1889 – September 4, 1947) was an American sound engineer. He won an Academy Award for Best Special Effects, and was nominated for three more in the same category.

Selected filmography
Johns won an Academy Award for Best Special Effects and, was nominated for three more:

Won
 Wonder Man (1945)

Nominated
 Gone with the Wind (1939)
 Rebecca (1940)
 Since You Went Away (1944)

References

External links

1889 births
1947 deaths
American audio engineers
Best Visual Effects Academy Award winners
People from Kansas